Surf or SURF may refer to:

Commercial products 
 Surf (detergent), a brand of laundry detergent made by Unilever

Computers and software 
 "Surfing the Web", slang for exploring the World Wide Web
 surf (web browser), a lightweight web browser for Unix-like systems
 Surf (video game), a 2020 video game included with Microsoft Edge
 SURF, an acronym for "Speeded up robust features", a computer vision algorithm

Education 
 Summer Undergraduate Research Fellowship, a common summer immersion experience in higher education which supplement research activities that occur during the academic year

Music 
 Surf (Roddy Frame album), a 2002 album released by Roddy Frame
 Surf (Donnie Trumpet & The Social Experiment album), a 2015 album by Donnie Trumpet & The Social Experiment
 Surf music, a genre of popular music associated with surf culture
 "Surf" (Mac Miller song), a 2020 song by Mac Miller

Places 
 Surf, California, unincorporated community in Santa Barbara County near Lompoc
 Surf station, passenger rail station served by Amtrak’s Pacific Surfliner
 Sanford Underground Research Facility, national laboratory for experiments conducted deep underground, in South Dakota

Popular culture 
 Surf culture, the culture surrounding the sport of surfing

Ships 
 , the name of more than one United States Navy ship

Sports 
 Surfing, a surface water sport
 The Atlantic City Surf, a defunct professional baseball team that played in Atlantic City, New Jersey, in the United States from 1998 to 2008

Other uses 
 Surf zone, the foreshore region where approaching ocean surface waves get taller and break to form foamy/bubbly surface known as surf
 SURF (Stanford US-Russia Forum)
 Scottish Urban Regeneration Forum, an urban renewal body
 Sanford Underground Research Facility, the underground laboratory
 SURFnet, the university computing organisation in the Netherlands

See also 
 Surfing (disambiguation)
 Serfdom
 Surf and turf
 Surf City (disambiguation)
 Surf clam (disambiguation)